Avrely is an old and rare Russian male first name. Its feminine version is Avreliya.

The name was included into various, often handwritten, church calendars throughout the 17th–19th centuries, but was omitted from the official Synodal Menologium at the end of the 19th century. In 1924–1930, the name was included into various Soviet calendars, which included the new and often artificially created names, although in this case the name was simply re-introduced.

Its diminutives include Avrelya, Relya, and Ava.

The patronymics derived from "Avrely" are "" (Avreliyevich), "" (Avrelyevich; both masculine); and "" (Avreliyevna), "" (Avrelyevna; both feminine).

See also
Avrelian

References

Notes

Sources
Н. А. Петровский (N. A. Petrovsky). "Словарь русских личных имён" (Dictionary of Russian First Names). ООО Издательство "АСТ". Москва, 2005. 
[1] А. В. Суперанская (A. V. Superanskaya). "Современный словарь личных имён: Сравнение. Происхождение. Написание" (Modern Dictionary of First Names: Comparison. Origins. Spelling). Айрис-пресс. Москва, 2005. 
[2] А. В. Суперанская (A. V. Superanskaya). "Словарь русских имён" (Dictionary of Russian Names). Издательство Эксмо. Москва, 2005. 

